Sam Rockwell (born November 5, 1968) is an American actor. He is known for appearing in independent films and also as a character actor portraying a wide variety of roles both comedic and dramatic in films such as Lawn Dogs (1997), The Green Mile (1999), Galaxy Quest (1999), Confessions of a Dangerous Mind (2002), Matchstick Men (2003), The Hitchhiker's Guide to the Galaxy (2005), Moon (2009), Frost/Nixon (2008), Iron Man 2 (2010), Conviction (2010), Cowboys & Aliens (2011), Seven Psychopaths (2012), The Way, Way Back (2013), Three Billboards Outside Ebbing, Missouri (2017), Vice (2018), Jojo Rabbit (2019), Richard Jewell (2019), and The Best of Enemies (2019).

Rockwell won the Academy Award for Best Supporting Actor for Martin McDonagh's Three Billboards Outside Ebbing, Missouri (2017). and was nominated the following year for portraying George W. Bush in Adam McKay's Vice (2018).  In 2019, he portrayed Bob Fosse in the FX biographical miniseries Fosse/Verdon, earning him a nomination for the Primetime Emmy Award for Outstanding Lead Actor in a Limited Series or Movie. In 2022 he received his first Tony Award nomination for Best Actor in a Play for his performance in the Broadway revival of David Mamet's American Buffalo. His other stage performances include Zoo Story (2001), A Behanding in Spokane (2010) and Fool for Love (2015).

Early life and education
Rockwell was born November 5, 1968, in Daly City, California. He is the only child of actors Pete Rockwell and Penny Hess. After their divorce when he was five, he was raised by his father in San Francisco, and spent his summers with his mother in New York. At age 10, he made a brief stage appearance playing Humphrey Bogart in an East Village improv comedy sketch with his mother.

He started high school at the San Francisco School of the Arts with Margaret Cho and Aisha Tyler, but received his high school diploma from Urban Pioneers, an Outward Bound-style alternative school. Rockwell explained, "I just wanted to get stoned, flirt with girls, go to parties." The school "had a reputation as a place stoners went because it was easy to graduate." The school helped him regain an interest in performing. After appearing in an independent film during his senior year, he moved to New York to pursue an acting career. He later enrolled in the Professional Actor Training Program at the William Esper Studio in New York.

Career

Early films

After his debut role in the controversial horror film Clownhouse in 1989, which he filmed while living in San Francisco, he moved to New York and trained at the William Esper Studios with teacher William Esper. His career slowly gained momentum in the early 1990s, when he alternated between small-screen guest spots in TV series like The Equalizer, NYPD Blue and Law & Order and small roles in films such as Last Exit to Brooklyn and Teenage Mutant Ninja Turtles. He also appeared as the title character in The Search for One-eye Jimmy (1994). During this time, Rockwell worked in restaurants as a busboy and delivered burritos by bicycle. At one point, Rockwell even worked as a private detective's assistant. "I tailed a chick who was having an affair and took pictures of her at this motel", he told Rolling Stone in 2002. "It was pretty sleazy." A well-paying Miller commercial in 1994 finally allowed him to pursue acting full-time.

The turning point in Rockwell's career was Tom DiCillo's film Box of Moonlight (1996), in which he played an eccentric man-child who dresses like Davy Crockett and lives in an isolated mobile home. The ensuing acclaim put him front and center with casting agents and newfound fans alike, with Rockwell himself acknowledging that "That film was definitely a turning point...I was sort of put on some independent film map after 10 years in New York."

He also received strong reviews for the film Lawn Dogs (1997), where he played a working-class lawn mower who befriends a wealthy 10-year-old girl (Mischa Barton) in an upper-class gated community in Kentucky; Rockwell's performance won him Best Actor honors at both the Montreal World Film Festival and the Catalan International Film Festival. In 1999, Rockwell played the deranged prisoner William "Wild Bill" Wharton in the Stephen King prison drama The Green Mile. At the time of the film's shooting, Rockwell explained why he was attracted to playing such unlikable characters. He said, "I like that dark stuff. I think heroes should be flawed. There's a bit of self-loathing in there, and a bit of anger... But after this, I've really got to play some lawyers, or a British aristocrat, or they'll put a label on me."

Hollywood recognition

After appearances as a bumbling actor in the science fiction parody Galaxy Quest (1999), as Francis Flute in the Shakespeare adaptation A Midsummer Night's Dream (1999), and as gregarious villain Eric Knox in Charlie's Angels (2000), Rockwell won the then-biggest leading role of his career as The Gong Show host Chuck Barris in George Clooney's directorial debut, Confessions of a Dangerous Mind (2002). Rockwell's performance was well-received, and the film earned generally positive reviews.

Rockwell has also received positive notices for his role opposite Nicolas Cage in Ridley Scott's Matchstick Men (2003), with Entertainment Weekly calling him "destined by a kind of excessive interestingness to forever be a colorful sidekick." He received somewhat more mixed reviews as Zaphod Beeblebrox in the film version of The Hitchhiker's Guide to the Galaxy (2005). He then had a notable supporting role as Charley Ford, brother of Casey Affleck's character Robert Ford, in the well-received drama The Assassination of Jesse James by the Coward Robert Ford (2007), in which Brad Pitt played the lead role of Jesse James. According to an interview on The Howard Stern Show, director Jon Favreau considered casting him as the titular character in Iron Man as the studio was initially hesitant to work with Robert Downey Jr., who had been considered for his role in The Hitchhiker's Guide to the Galaxy. Rockwell eventually appeared in Iron Man 2, released in 2010, as Tony Stark's rival weapons developer, Justin Hammer. He is said to have accepted the role without reading the script. He had never heard of the character before he was contacted about the role and was unaware that Hammer is an old man in the comic books.

In addition to big-budget feature films, Rockwell has also appeared in indie films such as The F Word and played a randy, Halloween-costume-clad Batman in a short, Robin's Big Date, opposite Justin Long as Robin. He also starred in the film Snow Angels (2008) opposite Kate Beckinsale. He has worked on several occasions with the comedy troupe Stella (Michael Ian Black, Michael Showalter and David Wain), making cameo appearances in their short films and eponymous TV series.

Rockwell played Victor Mancini in the film Choke (2008), based on the novel by Chuck Palahniuk. Critic Roger Ebert said of his performance that he "seems to have become the latter-day version of Christopher Walken – not all the time, but when you need him, he's your go-to guy for weirdness."

In 2007, Rockwell guest-starred in the web series Casted: The Continuing Chronicles of Derek Riffchyn, Greatest Casting Director in the World. Ever. He appears opposite Jonathan Togo as Derek and Justin Long as Scott. Rockwell plays an aspiring young actor named Pete Sampras. In 2009, he starred in the critically acclaimed science fiction film Moon, directed by Duncan Jones. His performance as a lonely astronaut on a long-term solo mission to the Moon was widely praised, with some critics calling for an Academy Award for Best Actor nomination. On May 3, 2010, it was announced that Rockwell would team up again with Iron Man 2 director Jon Favreau for Favreau's adaptation of the graphic novel Cowboys & Aliens. He played a bar owner named Doc who joins in the pursuit of the aliens.

Rockwell also had key roles in Martin McDonagh's Seven Psychopaths (2012), and Nat Faxon and Jim Rash's The Way, Way Back (2013). For his performance in The Way, Way Back, some critics felt he again deserved an Academy Award nomination.

In January 2014, it was announced that Rockwell was cast in The Eel, in which he played an escaped convict. The film was produced by Kevin Walsh, Nat Faxon, and Jim Rash, marking Rockwell's second collaboration with all three. Additionally, Rockwell starred in the 2015 remake of Poltergeist and along side of Anna Kendrick in the 2016 film Mr. Right. The movie is about an ex-cia agent turned hitman who gained a conscience and turned the tables on those that hired him as a hitman. He was also brutally honest with his girlfriend, played by Anna Kendrick, on what he does. She then turns into a hit woman. On May 3, 2016, it was announced that Rockwell would voice Mortimer Ramsey in the action video game Dishonored 2. Rockwell was cast along with other Marvel Cinematic Universe actors.

Rockwell re-teamed with McDonagh for the 2017 film Three Billboards Outside Ebbing, Missouri. His performance as a racist, bullying police officer Jason Dixon won several accolades, including his first Academy Award, as well as the Golden Globe Award for Best Supporting Actor – Motion Picture, two Screen Actors Guild Awards and the BAFTA Award for Best Actor in a Supporting Role. In August 2017, Rockwell was cast to play George W. Bush in Adam McKay's Vice, a biopic of Dick Cheney; he received his second nomination for the Best Supporting Actor Academy Award as a result. Rockwell was cast as Bob Fosse with Michelle Williams as Gwen Verdon in the 2019 miniseries Fosse/Verdon, for which he received critical acclaim and a Primetime Emmy Award nomination. That same year, Rockwell appeared in two acclaimed films, Richard Jewell and Jojo Rabbit. In 2020, he had a voice role in DreamWorks Animation's Trolls World Tour, also serving as a performer on the film's soundtrack; and also voiced Ivan the gorilla in the 2020 Disney+ film The One and Only Ivan. Rockwell also provided the voice of the main character Mr. Wolf in The Bad Guys.

Theater

Since 1992, Rockwell has been a member of the New York-based LAByrinth Theater Company, where John Ortiz is a co-artistic director. In 2005, Philip Seymour Hoffman directed him in Stephen Adly Guirgis' hit play The Last Days of Judas Iscariot. Rockwell workshopped a LAByrinth production, North of Mason-Dixon, which debuted in London in 2007 and then premiered in New York later the same year. Other plays in which Rockwell has performed include: Dumb Waiter (2001), Zoo Story (2001), The Hot L Baltimore (2000), Goosepimples (1998), Love and Human Remains, Face Divided, Orphans, Den of Thieves, Dessert at Waffle House, The Largest Elizabeth in the World, and A Behanding in Spokane.

In 2022 he returned to the Broadway stage in a revival of David Mamet's American Buffalo alongside Laurence Fishburne and Darren Criss. For his performance in the play, Rockwell received his first nomination for the Tony Award for Best Performance by a Leading Actor in a Play.

Personal life
Rockwell has never been married and stated in a 2007 interview, "I definitely don't want to become a parent. It's not my bag". He has been in a relationship with actress Leslie Bibb since 2007, when they reportedly met in Los Angeles as he was filming Frost/Nixon. They both appeared in Iron Man 2 and Don Verdean.

Awards and nominations

His performance as a troubled police deputy in the crime-drama Three Billboards Outside Ebbing, Missouri won the Academy Award for Best Supporting Actor, a Golden Globe and two Screen Actors Guild Awards. In 2018, his portrayal of George W. Bush in the biopic Vice earned him his second Academy Award nomination in the same category.

References

External links

 
 
 
 
 
 Sam Rockwell Interview

1968 births
Living people
20th-century American male actors
21st-century American male actors
American male film actors
American male stage actors
American male television actors
American male video game actors
American male voice actors
Best Supporting Actor AACTA International Award winners
Best Supporting Actor Academy Award winners
Best Supporting Actor BAFTA Award winners
Best Supporting Actor Golden Globe (film) winners
Independent Spirit Award for Best Supporting Male winners
Male actors from California
Male actors from San Francisco
Male actors from the San Francisco Bay Area
Outstanding Performance by a Cast in a Motion Picture Screen Actors Guild Award winners
Outstanding Performance by a Male Actor in a Miniseries or Television Movie Screen Actors Guild Award winners
Outstanding Performance by a Male Actor in a Supporting Role Screen Actors Guild Award winners
People from Daly City, California
Silver Bear for Best Actor winners
William Esper Studio alumni